Loading Mercury with a Pitchfork is Richard Brautigan's ninth poetry publication. Published in 1976, the book includes 127 poems. The four line title poem discusses the effort and interest in undertaking an obviously impossible task, such as loading the liquid metal Mercury using only a pitchfork.   Loading mercury with a pitchfork
   your truck is almost full. The neighbors
   take a certain pride in you. They
        stand around watching. 
"Loading Mercury with a Pitchfork" (1971)

External links
Entry on Brautigan.net

References

1976 poetry books
Works by Richard Brautigan
American poetry collections